Pyra may refer to:

 Pyra (comics)
 Pyra Labs, a Google company which founded the Blogger.com service
 Pyra of Herakles, the ruins of a Doric temple from the 3rd century B.C.
 Pyra, Russia, an urban-type settlement in Nizhny Novgorod Oblast, Russia
 DragonBox Pyra, a Linux-based handheld computer with gaming controls
 Jakob Immanuel Pyra (1715–1744), German poet
 Pyra, a character from Xenoblade Chronicles 2

See also
 Pyre (disambiguation)
 Große Pyra, river in Saxony, Germany
 Kleine Pyra, river in Saxony, Germany